William Farnhurst (fl. 1415–1422) of Chichester, Sussex, was an English politician.

He was a Member (MP) of the Parliament of England for Chichester in 1415, March 1416, May 1421 and 1422.

References

14th-century births
15th-century deaths
English MPs 1415
People from Chichester
English MPs March 1416
English MPs May 1421
English MPs 1422